Adamenko  is a Ukrainian language last name derived from the given name Adam. The Russian-language spelling is the same, Belarusian: Adamenka.

Notable people with the last name include:
Aleksandr Adamenko, Belarusian association football player who participated in the 2013 Belarusian Super Cup
Maksym Adamenko, Ukrainian association football player who plays for Lithuanian club FK Kruoja Pakruojis
Mykyta Adamenko, Ukrainian association football player who participated in the 2014 UEFA European Under-19 Championship
Stanislav Adamenko, one of the designers of chandeliers in the Zoloti Vorota metro station in Kyiv, Ukraine
, a World War II Hero of the Soviet Union

Viktor Adamenko, Belarusian scientist who wrote a dissertation on Kirlian photography

See also
 

Ukrainian-language surnames
Patronymic surnames
Surnames from given names